Ethan David Bristow (born 27 November 2001) is an English footballer who plays as a defender for  side Tranmere Rovers.

Career

Reading
Bristow signed his first professional contract with Reading in October 2019, with the contract lasting until 2021.

Bristow made his debut for Reading on 5 September 2020 in a 3–1 EFL Cup victory over Colchester United.

On 20 May 2022, Reading confirmed that Bristow would leave the club upon the expiration of his contract.

Tranmere Rovers
On 14 June 2022, Tranmere Rovers announced the signing of Bristow to a two-year contract.

Career statistics

References

2001 births
Living people
People from Maidenhead
English footballers
Association football defenders
Reading F.C. players
Tranmere Rovers F.C. players
English Football League players